A list of films produced in Turkey in 1970 (see 1970 in film):

See also
1970 in Turkey

References

Lists of Turkish films
1970